Afrocanthium keniense is a species of flowering plant in the family Rubiaceae. It is endemic to Kenya. It is threatened by habitat loss.

Taxonomy
In 2004, a molecular phylogenetic study of DNA sequences found the genus Canthium to be polyphyletic. The authors of this study transferred 20 species, including Canthium keniense, to a new genus, Afrocanthium.

References

External links
World Checklist of Rubiaceae

Vanguerieae
Endemic flora of Kenya
Vulnerable flora of Africa
Taxonomy articles created by Polbot
Plants described in 1932